Kuraneh (also Romanized as Kūrāneh) is a village in Eqbal-e Sharqi Rural District, in the Central District of Qazvin County, Qazvin Province, Iran. At the 2006 census, its population was 1,351, in 360 families.

References 

Populated places in Qazvin County